The Aldrich Mountains are a mountain range in Grant County, Oregon, United States. An east–west range rising south of the John Day River valley, the mountains are bounded on the west by the South Fork John Day River, on the south by Murderers Creek and the Bear Valley, and on the east by Canyon Creek. Most of the Aldrich Mountains and the mountainous terrain south of them are contained within the Malheur National Forest. Across the South Fork John Day River to the west are the Ochoco Mountains, while across Canyon Creek to the east is the Strawberry Range.

References

External links

Cedar Grove Botanical Area - Conifer Country blog

Malheur National Forest
Mountain ranges of Oregon
Mountain ranges of Grant County, Oregon